Francisco Javier Rodríguez Morales (born December 20, 1985), better known by his stage name MAKA is a Spanish singer and songwriter.  His music style is a fusion of flamenco, Spanish hip hop and reggaeton. The music video to his song "" (literally, "The Art of tu") has been viewed over 65 million times on YouTube.

Discography
 Detrás De Esta Pinta Hay Un Flamenco (2021)
 Maldiciones (2020)
Bendiciones (2020)
Dvuende (2018)
Alma (2016)
Raíces (2016)
Pvreza (2015)
Makanudo (2015)
Pna (2014)
Quién

References 

Spanish singer-songwriters
Living people
1985 births
21st-century Spanish singers
21st-century Spanish male singers